Danko Branković (born 5 November 2000) is a Croatian professional basketball player for Mega Basket of the ABA League and the Basketball League of Serbia.

Professional career 
Branković grew up in the youth selections of Cibona, where he also started his professional career. In September 2020, he was loaned out to Dubrava for which he played in 11 matches in the Croatian League while still playing for Cibona in  the ABA League. Branković attracted attention of the media during the off-season 2021 Liburnia Cup held in Opatija. In the competition of Cedevita Olimpija, Partizan and Pesaro, Cibona won the tournament and Branković was named MVP.  In February 2022, Cibona won the Croatian Cup and Branković was named the MVP.

On 4 July 2022, Branković signed with Bayern Munich of the Basketball Bundesliga (BBL). On 31 July, he was loan out to Serbian club Mega Basket for two seasons.

National team career 
Branković played for the Croatian national youth system. He was a member of rosters that competed at the 2016 FIBA U16 European Championship, 2018 FIBA U18 European Championship and 2019 FIBA U20 European Championship.

In November 2021, Branković debuted for the Croatian A team at the 2023 FIBA Basketball World Cup qualification game against Slovenia.

References

External links 
 Profile at aba-liga.com
 Profile at basketball-reference.com
 Profile at proballers.com
 Profile at realgm.com

2000 births
Living people
ABA League players
Basketball players from Zagreb
Centers (basketball)
Croatian expatriate basketball people in Serbia
Croatian men's basketball players
KK Cibona players
KK Dubrava players
KK Mega Basket players